Jorge Alberto Ramos Vélez is a Puerto Rican politician and former senator. He was a member of the Senate of Puerto Rico from 2001 to 2004 representing the Popular Democratic Party (PPD).

Ramos Vélez is the son of politician Jorge Alberto Ramos Comas and Minerva Vélez Jusino. Has a Master of Arts (M.A.) in Public Administration from the Pontifical Catholic University of Puerto Rico.

Ramos Vélez was elected to the Senate of Puerto Rico representing the District of Mayagüez at the 2000 general elections.

References

Members of the Senate of Puerto Rico
People from San Germán, Puerto Rico
Pontifical Catholic University of Puerto Rico alumni
Popular Democratic Party (Puerto Rico) politicians
Living people
1970 births